Cesarec is a Croatian surname.

Notable people with the name include:

 August Cesarec (1893–1941), Croatian writer and activist
 Danijel Cesarec (born 1983), Croatian footballer

See also
 Cesar (surname)

Croatian surnames